aP2 (adipocyte Protein 2) is a carrier protein for fatty acids that is primarily expressed in adipocytes and macrophages.  aP2 is also called fatty acid binding protein 4 (FABP4).  Blocking this protein either through genetic engineering or drugs has the possibility of treating heart disease and the metabolic syndrome.

See also 
 Fatty acid-binding protein

References

External links
 
 
 PDBe-KB provides an overview of all the structure information available in the PDB for Human Fatty acid-binding protein, adipocyte 
 PDBe-KB provides an overview of all the structure information available in the PDB for Mouse Fatty acid-binding protein, adipocyte 

 

Proteins